Damiano Coletta (born 7 December 1960 in Latina) is an Italian politician, physician and former footballer.

Coletta ran as an independent for the office of Mayor of Latina at the 2016 Italian local elections, supported by a centre-left coalition. He won and took office on 20 June 2016.

See also
2016 Italian local elections
List of mayors of Latina

References

External links
 

1960 births
Living people
Mayors of Latina, Lazio
People from Latina, Lazio
Footballers from Lazio
Sportspeople from the Province of Latina